Rhodocybella is a genus of cyphelloid fungi in the Entolomataceae family.  It contains just one known species, Rhodocybella rhododendri, which is found in North America on Rhododendron stems after heavy rain.

The fertile inner surface of the fruit body is pinkish and either has no gills at all, or shows only a rudimentary trace of them.

The prefix Rhodo- means "red", cybe means "head", and -ella is a diminutive suffix.

It is not to be confused with Rhodocyphella, which is another small genus of cyphelloid fungi, but which belongs to family Tricholomataceae.

References

Entolomataceae
Taxa described in 1987
Fungi of North America
Monotypic Agaricales genera
Taxa named by Ron Petersen